The Intel Developer Forum (IDF) was a biannual gathering of technologists to discuss Intel products and products based on Intel products. The first IDF was held in 1997.

To emphasize the importance of China, the Spring 2007 IDF was held in Beijing instead of San Francisco, and San Francisco and Taipei shared the Fall IDF event in September and October, respectively. Three IDF shows were scheduled in 2008; with the date of IDF San Francisco notably moving to August rather than September. In previous years, events were held in major cities around the world such as San Francisco, Mumbai, Bangalore, Moscow, Cairo, Sao Paulo, Amsterdam, Munich and Tokyo.

On April 17, 2017, Intel announced that it would no longer be hosting IDF. As a result of this announcement, IDF17, which was scheduled for August in San Francisco, was canceled.

2007 events
 April 17–18, 2007 - Beijing, China
 September 18–20, 2007 - San Francisco, United States
 October 15–16, 2007 - Taipei, Taiwan

2008 events
 April 2–3, 2008 - Shanghai, China
 August 19–21, 2008 - San Francisco, United States
 October 20–21, 2008 - Taipei, Taiwan

2009 events
 April 8–9, 2009 - Beijing, China
 September 22–24, 2009 - San Francisco, United States
 November 16–17, 2009 - Taipei, Taiwan

2010 events
 April 13–14, 2010 - Beijing, China
 September 13–15, 2010 - San Francisco, United States

2011 events
 April 12–13, 2011 - Beijing, China
 September 13–15, 2011 - San Francisco, United States

2012 events
 April 11–12, 2012 - Beijing, China
 May 15, 2012 - Sao Paulo, Brazil
 September 11–13, 2012 - San Francisco, United States

2013 events
 April 10–11, 2013 - Beijing, China
 September 10–12, 2013 - San Francisco, United States

2014 events
 March 8–10, 2014 - Shenzhen, China
 September 9-11, 2014 - San Francisco, United States

2015 events
 April 7-10, 2015 - Shenzhen, China
 August 18–20, 2015 - San Francisco, United States

2016 events
 April 13-14, 2016 - Shenzhen, China
 August 16–18, 2016 - San Francisco, United States

2017 events
Intel originally announced that in 2017, no event would be hosted in China and that the San Francisco event would feature a new format.

On April 17, The event was cancelled with the retirement of the entire program.

References

External links 

Official website

Developer Forum
Computer conferences
Recurring events established in 1997
Recurring events disestablished in 2017